Tošić is a Serbian and Croatian surname which is more common among Serbs than Croats.

Notable people with this name include:

 Aleksandar Tošić (born 1970), Serbian racing driver
 Dragomir Tošić (1909–1985), Yugoslavian football defender
 Duško Tošić (born 1985), Serbian footballer
 Goran Tošić (born 1982), Serbian tennis player
 Jelena Kostanić Tošić (born 1981), Croatian retired tennis player
 Luka Tošić (born 1988), Slovenian ice hockey player
 Nemanja Tošić (born 1986), Serbian footballer
 Rade Tošić (born 1965), former Bosnian Serb football player
 Roko Tošić (born 1979), Croatian table tennis player
 Vladimir Tošić (born 1949), Serbian composer and visual artist
 Zoran Tošić (born 1987), Serbian footballer

References 

Croatian surnames
Serbian surnames